Argañín is a municipality located in the province of Zamora, Castile and León, Spain.

References

Municipalities of the Province of Zamora